242nd Brigade may refer to:

 242nd Training Centre (Russia)
 242nd Mixed Brigade (Spain)
 242nd Brigade (United Kingdom)

See also

 242nd Division (disambiguation)